Qaracik Zeyid (also, Qaracekzeyid, Qaracık Zeyid, Qaracıq Zeyd, Karachik Zeid, and Karagidzhit-End) is a village and municipality in the Khachmaz Rayon of Azerbaijan.  It has a population of 1,039. The municipality consists of the villages of Qaracik Zeyid, Qədiməlikqışlaq, and  Qaracıq.

References

External links

Populated places in Khachmaz District